Héhalom is a village in Nógrád County, Hungary with 1,001 inhabitants (2014).

References

Populated places in Nógrád County